Thermanaerovibrio velox is a Gram-negative, moderately thermophilic, organotrophic and anaerobic bacterium from the genus of Thermanaerovibrio which has been isolated from cyanobacterial mat from Uzon caldera in Russia.

References

External links
Type strain of Thermanaerovibrio velox at BacDive -  the Bacterial Diversity Metadatabase

Bacteria described in 2000
Synergistota